Cyana ugandana is a moth of the  family Erebidae. It was described by Strand in 1912. It is found in the Democratic Republic of Congo, Ethiopia, Kenya and Uganda.

Subspecies
Cyana ugandana ugandana
Cyana ugandana abyssinica Karisch, 2003 (Ethiopia)

References

Cyana
Moths described in 1912
Moths of Africa